FK Grafičar is a Montenegrin football club based in Podgorica. The club was founded in 1948 and during the season 2016-17 was relegated from Montenegrin Second League.

History
FK Grafičar was founded in 1948 in Nikšić, as a club of workers of state printing house Pobjeda. After few months, with removal of Pobjeda, the club gone to Podgorica.

During the first decades of its existence, FK Grafičar, with seat at Stari Aerodrom quarter, participated in the Fourth League - Central. At that time, big local rivalry between FK Grafičar and FK Ribnica from neighbouring Konik settlement was born.

First significant success, FK Grafičar made at season 1970-71 by winning the Fourth League title and gained first-ever promotion to the Montenegrin Republic League.

During the next two decades, FK Grafičar played overall ten seasons in third-ranked Republic League, often with relegations to lowest Regional League. Best results in Montenegrin Republic League, FK Grafičar made during the seasons 1972-73 and 1974–75, finishing as a third-placed team. During the start of the nineties, contract with Pobjeda printing house was finished, so FK Grafičar became an independent club.

After Montenegrin independence, FK Grafičar became a member of Montenegrin Third League. In October 2007, FK Grafičar played in the first round of the Montenegrin Cup, against FK Budućnost (0:2), and it is the greatest match in the history of the club.

At 2007, old stadium of FK Grafičar at Stari Aerodrom is broken, so the club moved to Camp FSCG, on pitches shared with FK Mladost and FK Ribnica.

Historical success of FK Grafičar came at season 2014–15. After winning the Third League title, the club participated in the playoffs with FK Brskovo and FK Sloga Radovići and gained a promotion to the Montenegrin Second League.

FK Grafičar debuted in the Second League of the 2015-16 season , and finished seventh place, which was a big success for young team from Podgorica outskirts. A season later, because of financial crisis and technical problems, FK Grafičar were automatically relegated from the Second League after 11 weeks.

Seasons in Montenegrin Second League
For the first time, FK Grafičar played in the Montenegrin Second League on season 2015–16. A season later, the club was automatically relegated after 11 weeks, following technical problems and financial crisis.

Seasons in Montenegrin Republic League
Below is a score of FK Grafičar by every single season in Montenegrin Republic League.

Honours and achievements
 Montenegrin Third League – 1
winners (1): 2014–15
 Montenegrin Fourth League – 3
winners (3): 1970–71, 1985–86, 2003–04
Central Region Cup – 1
winners (1): 2014

Current squad

Stadium

FK Grafičar plays their home games at Camp FSCG. Previously, the team had their own stadium, but in 2007, after the expansion of the quarter buildings, the ground was demolished and the club moved to Camp FSCG.

See also
Camp FSCG
Podgorica
Montenegrin Second League
Montenegrin clubs in Yugoslav football competitions (1946–2006)

References

External links
 Profile by Football Association of Montenegro
 Fanpage on Facebook

Association football clubs established in 1948
Football clubs in Podgorica
1948 establishments in Montenegro